Ramiro Borja is a retired Ecuadorean-American soccer player.  He played professionally in the Major Indoor Soccer League, American Indoor Soccer Association and American Professional Soccer League.

Borja, brother of Chico Borja, attended Rutgers University, playing for the Scarlet Knights soccer team in 1979 and 1980.  In 1986, Borja signed with the Memphis Storm of the American Indoor Soccer Association.  In 1987, he moved to the Los Angeles Lazers of the Major Indoor Soccer League, but was back with the Storm a year later.  In 1989, he moved outdoors with the Albany Capitals of the American Soccer League.  He played three seasons with the Capitals, the last two in the American Professional Soccer League.  He was 1991 First Team All League.

International
Borja competed for the Puerto Rico national football team during Puerto Rico's qualification games for the 1994 FIFA World Cup.

References

External links
 MISL: Ramiro Borja

Living people
1961 births
Footballers from Quito
American soccer players
American Soccer League (1988–89) players
American Indoor Soccer Association players
American Professional Soccer League players
Albany Capitals players
Los Angeles Lazers players
Major Indoor Soccer League (1978–1992) players
Memphis Storm players
Rutgers Scarlet Knights men's soccer players
Rutgers University alumni
Sportspeople from Quito
Ecuadorian emigrants to the United States
Puerto Rican footballers
Puerto Rico international footballers
Association football midfielders
Association football forwards